Joseph Kevin Bracken (Irish: Seosamh Caoimhín Ó Breacáin; 1852–1904) commonly known as JK Bracken, was a local politician, Fenian and founder of the Gaelic Athletic Association.

Bracken was one of the seven founding members of the Gaelic Athletic Association in 1884. Bracken was also the first chairman of the Tipperary County Board, and served as vice-president of the GAA. One of the original seven signatories, he was the longest serving member on the GAA national executive.  He was an elected representative and chairman of Templemore Urban District Council, and was a member of the oath-bound republican organisation the Irish Republican Brotherhood. Bracken's son, Brendan Bracken, was Minister of Information in Britain from 1941 to 1945 and created the modern Financial Times.

References

1852 births
1904 deaths
Chairmen of county boards of the Gaelic Athletic Association
Founders of Gaelic games institutions
Members of the Irish Republican Brotherhood
People from County Tipperary
Tipperary County Board administrators